Beta-soluble NSF attachment protein is a SNAP protein involved in vesicular trafficking and exocytosis which is encoded by the NAPB gene humans is.

References

Further reading

Human proteins